"No Point" is a song by avant-garde band King Missile. It appears on the band's 1990 album Mystical Shit.

Content
In "No Point," a psychedelic rock track with prominent lead guitar, frontman John S. Hall sings a list of states and activities to which "there is no point." The list includes answering the telephone, opening the mail, using drugs, not using drugs, and life and death themselves.

In the liner notes of the compilation Mystical Shit & Fluting on the Hump, Hall writes of "No Point":

Music video
The video for "No Point" was directed for $1200 by Benton Bainbridge. In the video, Hall plays a "seeker" who is repeatedly visited in his bedroom by an enigmatic "seer," played by Andrea Cook. The seer presents the seeker with an assortment of objects, such as an alarm clock, a jacket, and a wind-up toy, which he invariably throws out his window and onto the sidewalk below, on which the other members of King Missile are playing. In between visits from the seer, the seeker uses a crystal ball to view various mystical and/or psychedelic images. At the end of the video, the seer appears to have achieved some form of enlightenment.

Hall thinks the video "sucked."

References

King Missile songs
Experimental rock songs
1990 singles
1990 songs
Songs written by John S. Hall
Songs written by Dave Rick